Lynette Christine Knackstedt (April 26, 1970 – December 7, 2007) was an American punk and ska musician, as well as a member of the band Skankin' Pickle.

Early life 
Knackstedt was born in Santa Clara, California. She graduated from Los Gatos High School in 1988. She attended De Anza Junior College and San Francisco City College.

Career 
Knackstedt was best known as a core member of Skankin' Pickle, a ska band formed in 1989, with her childhood friend Mike Park, Lars Nylander, Chuck Phelps, Gerry Lundquist and Mike Mattingly. She played guitar and was one of the band's vocalists. The band recorded five albums and toured the United States performing in the early 1990s. After she and Nylander toured Europe as Skankin' Pickle in 1997, the band officially dissolved, but the pair continued performing as the 78 RPMs. She also performed with Lucifer's Strip Club Band. 

Knackstedt was also involved in running Dill Records, the band's independent record company, launched in 1991.

Personal life and legacy 
Knackstedt was out as a lesbian. She died from a drug overdose in 2007, in San Francisco, at the age of 37. Her Skankin' Pickle bandmates played a memorial show together in 2008, and raised money for a San Francisco drug rehabilitation program. She was among the performers featured on the compilation CD Ska Down her Way: Women of Ska (2013), from Shanachie Records.

References 

1970 births
2007 deaths
Ska musicians
People from Santa Clara County, California
De Anza College alumni